Autochloris nigridior is a moth of the subfamily Arctiinae. It was described by Rothschild in 1931. It is found in Brazil.

References

Arctiinae
Moths described in 1931
Moths of South America